George Wadsworth II (April 3, 1893 – March 5, 1958) was a United States diplomat, specializing in the Middle East.

Life
Wadsworth was born in Buffalo, New York and received a degree in chemical engineering from Union College in Schenectady, New York. He became interested in teaching abroad and moved to Beirut, Lebanon and joined the staff of the American University of Beirut as a professor (he served there from 1914 to 1917). To supplement his income, he took a part-time job working as a clerk in the United States consulate in Beirut.

In May 1921, he married Dorothy Marnard Lasell. She died on November 20, 1928.; married, May 1, 1936, to Norma Mack, daughter of Norman E. Mack and Harriet Taggart Mack.

He had two children with his first wife: George Wadsworth Lasell and Caroline Harris (née Wadsworth).

Foreign Service career
In 1917, he entered the Foreign Service full-time and served in positions at embassies in the Middle East and Eastern Europe.

From 1936 to 1940, Wadsworth served as Consul General in Jerusalem. In 1941, Wadsworth was serving in the United States embassy in Rome, Italy under Ambassador William Phillips who had been tasked with persuading Benito Mussolini to not enter World War II on the side of the Axis Powers. Unfortunately, his efforts failed and he fled Italy five days before the declaration of war. During those five days, Wadsworth served as Chargé d'affaires ad interim there. When war was declared by Italy on December 11, 1941, Wadsworth was informed personally by Italian Foreign Minister Galeazzo Ciano. He then worked with Italian authorities to secure the safe passage of the embassy staff home, and was one of the three final staff members to leave in May 1942. He arrived back in New York by ocean liner in June. This was Wadsworth's first duty as Chief of Mission.

On returning to the US, Wadsworth was nearly immediately assigned to be Consul General, and then the first Ambassador to Syria and Lebanon, a political move that strengthened those countries against claims by Vichy France. 
After the war, he was made the first Ambassador to Iraq, previously served only by a lower-ranking Minister Plenipotentiary. 
He was subsequently in his career made ambassador to Turkey, Czechoslovakia, and then Saudi Arabia, and Yemen.

Starting during his time in Turkey, Wadsworth began a practice that would be one of the hallmarks of his diplomatic career. He raised money to establish a golf course in Ankara, which became a "social center" for diplomatic circles. Throughout the remainder of his career, he raised funds to set up nine other golf courses in the Middle East, with one newspaper describing him as the "Johnny Appleseed of golf courses, sowing fairways in the most impossible places."

He died of cancer in 1958, aged 64, less than a month before he was scheduled to retire on his 65th birthday.

References

Sources

External links

1893 births
1958 deaths
Ambassadors of the United States to Italy
Ambassadors of the United States to Syria
Ambassadors of the United States to Lebanon
Ambassadors of the United States to Iraq
Ambassadors of the United States to Turkey
Ambassadors of the United States to Czechoslovakia
Ambassadors of the United States to Saudi Arabia
Ambassadors of the United States to Yemen
Deaths from cancer
People from Buffalo, New York
Ambassadors of the United States to North Yemen
Wadsworth family
United States Foreign Service personnel
20th-century American diplomats